Bang Yai is one of the six subdistricts (tambon) of Bang Yai District, in Nonthaburi Province, Thailand. The subdistrict is bounded by (clockwise from north) Ban Mai, Bang Mae Nang, Bang Muang, Sala Klang and Sala Ya subdistricts. In 2020 it had a total population of 20,616 people.

Administration

Central administration
The subdistrict is subdivided into 6 administrative villages (muban).

Local administration
The area of the subdistrict is shared by two local administrative organizations.
Bang Yai Subdistrict Municipality
Bang Yai Subdistrict Administrative Organization

References

External links
Website of Bang Yai Subdistrict Municipality
Website of Bang Yai Subdistrict Administrative Organization

Tambon of Nonthaburi province
Populated places in Nonthaburi province